Pierpaolo Parisio (1473–1545) was an Italian bishop and Cardinal.

Biography
Born at Cosenza in 1473, he was appointed on Sep 1528 by Pope Clement VII as bishop of Anglona e Tursi and on 11 Jan 1538 by Pope Paul III as bishop of Nusco.
On 19 Dec 1539, he was created cardinal and installed as Cardinal-Priest of Santa Balbina on 28 Jan 1540. He died on 11 May 1545 in Rome, Italy.

References

External links and additional sources
 (for Chronology of Bishops) 
 (for Chronology of Bishops) 
 (for Chronology of Bishops) 
 (for Chronology of Bishops) 

1473 births
1545 deaths
People from Cosenza
Bishops in Basilicata
Bishops in Campania
Participants in the Council of Trent
16th-century Italian Roman Catholic bishops
Bishops appointed by Pope Clement VII
Bishops appointed by Pope Paul III